Alexander Gassner (born 9 August 1989) is a German skeleton racer who has competed since 2004. In 2007, he joined the German national squad. Gassner became Junior World Champion in skeleton in 2010. 2011–12 Skeleton World Cup he finished 6th. He took first place in the 2012 German Skeleton Championship.

References

External links

1989 births
Living people
German male skeleton racers
Olympic skeleton racers of Germany
Skeleton racers at the 2018 Winter Olympics
Skeleton racers at the 2022 Winter Olympics
People from Bistrița-Năsăud County
21st-century German people